Glipa bisbimaculata is a species of beetle in the genus Glipa. It was described in 1911.

References

bisbimaculata
Beetles described in 1911